was the sixth shōgun of the Ashikaga shogunate who reigned from 1429 to 1441 during the Muromachi period of Japan.  Yoshinori was the son of the third shōgun Ashikaga Yoshimitsu. His childhood name was Harutora.

Family
 Father: Ashikaga Yoshimitsu
 Mother: Fujiwara no Yoshiko (1358–1399)
 Wives: 
 Hino Muneko (d. 1447)
 Sanjo Yoshiko, daughter of Sanjo Masaaki
 Concubines:
 Hino Shigeko (1411–1463)
 Kozaisho no Tsubone
 Shoben-dono
 Otomi no Kata, daughter of Tamagawa no Miya and granddaughter of Emperor Chōkei
 Children:
 Ashikaga Yoshikatsu by Shigeko
 Ashikaga Yoshimasa by Shigeko
 Daijin'in by Shigeko
 Ashikaga Yoshikano later Shogoin by Shigeko
 a daughter by Kozaisho
 Ashikaga Yoshimi by Kozaisho
 Ashikaga Masatomo (1435–1491) by Shoben
 Ashikaga Yoshinaga by Shoben
 Kosho'in
 Sankyo

Shogunal succession
After the death of the Fifth shōgun Ashikaga Yoshikazu in 1425, The Fourth Shōgun Ashikaga Yoshimochi resumed his role as head of the shogunate. Yoshimochi had no other sons, nor did he name a successor before he himself died in 1428.

Yoshinori, who had been a Buddhist monk since the age of ten, became Sei-i Taishōgun on the day of Yoshimochi's death.  From amongst the handful of possible Ashikaga candidates, his name was selected by the shogunal deputy (Kanrei), Hatakeyama Mitsuie, who drew lots in the sanctuary of Iwashimizu Hachiman Shrine in Kyoto; and it was believed that Hachiman's influence had affected this auspicious choice.

Significant events which shaped the period during which Yoshinori was shōgun:
 1429 – Yoshinori appointed shōgun.
 1430 – The Southern Court's army surrenders.
 1432 – Akamatsu Mitsusuke flees; Yoshinori receives rescript from China.
 1433 – Ōtomo rebels; Hieizan monks rebel.
 1434 – Tosen bugyō established to regulate foreign affairs.<ref name="k1">Kinihara, Misako. The Establishment of the Tosen-bugyō in the Reign of Ashikaga Yoshinori" (唐船奉行の成立 : 足利義教による飯尾貞連の登用)], Tokyo Woman's Christian University: Essays and Studies. Abstract.</ref>
 1436 – Yasaka Pagoda at Hokanji in Kyoto destroyed by fire.
 1438 – Kantō kubō Ashikaga Mochiuji rebels – Eikyō Rebellion.
 1439 – Mochiuji commits suicide; dissatisfaction with Yoshinori grows.
 1440 – Yasaka Pagoda at Hokanji in Kyoto re-constructed by Yoshinori.
 1441 – Yoshinori grants Shimazu suzerainty over the Ryūkyū Islands; Akamatsu murders Yoshinori – Kakitsu Incident; Yamana kills Akamatsu.

Yoshinori strengthened the power of the shogunate by defeating Ashikaga Mochiuji in the Eikyo Rebellion of 1438. During the period, Chinese contacts were increased and Zen Buddhism gained influence, which had broad cultural consequences. For example, the Hon-dō or main hall at Ikkyu-ji is today the oldest standing Tang-style temple in the Yamashiro (southern Kyoto Prefecture) and Yamato (Nara Prefecture) Provinces.  It was built in 1434 and was dedicated by Yoshinori.

Foreign relations
In 1432, trade and diplomatic relations between Japan and China] were restored.  Both had been discontinued by Yoshimochi. The Chinese emperor reached out to Japan by sending a letter to the shogunate via the kingdom of the Ryūkyū Islands; Yoshinori responded favorably.Keene, 

According to Mansai Jugo Nikki (満済准后日記), the system of the Tosen-bugyō (唐船奉行) was established in 1434 to mediate overseas trade.  The functions of the Tosen-bugyō  included: (1) defending trading ships in Japanese waters, (2) procuring export goods, (3) mediating between the Muromachi shogunate and shipping interests, and (4) managing record-keeping. It is significant that the Muromachi shogunate was the first to appoint the executive officers of the samurai class to high positions in its diplomatic bureaucracy.  After Yoshinori's time, the totosen (渡唐船) (the fleet of ships going from Japan to Ming China) consisted of the ships belonging principally to three different kinds of owners: the Muromachi shōgun, temples, and the shugo daimyō.

Assassination
Yoshinori was notorious for his oppressive measures and unpredictable dictatorial whims. In 1441, Yoshinori was assassinated by Akamatsu Noriyasu, son of Akamatsu Mitsusuke who invited him to a Noh performance at their residence and assassinated him during the evening play.  Yoshinori was 48 at the age of his assassination which was organized by Mitsusuke, who had learned that Yoshinori planned to bestow three provinces belonging to him to his cousin Akamatsu Sadamura, who came to be given an important position by Yoshinori because Sadamura's younger sister became his concubine and gave birth to a son. Shortly thereafter, it was determined that his 8-year-old son, Yoshikatsu, would become the new shōgun. Akamatsu Mitsusuke had already a problem in 1427 with the fifth Shogun Ashikaga Yoshimochi, who tried to confiscate his territory; Mitsusuke burned down his own residence in Kyoto and went to Harima province, and gathered his family to prepare for the battle. This infuriated Yoshimochi, who ordered to search and kill them, but the confusion continued as those who were ordered to subjugate them refused to dispatch troops. Also died in the incident Yamana Hirotaka (Shugo of Iwami province), Kyogoku Takakazu (Shugo of Yamashiro, Izumo, Oki and Hida provinces), and Ouchi Mochiyo (Shugo of Suo, Nagato, Buzen and Chikuzen provinces). Mitsusuke confined himself in Yamashiro Castle, and died with 69 members of his family on October 12, after he was attacked by the shogunal army.

Although the Ashikaga line continued through this seventh shogun, the power of the shōguns gradually eroded and the shogunate fell into decline. The mere fact of that assassination and treason had become a reality served to undercut the previous military ethic of loyalty.

Eras of Yoshinori's bakufu
The years in which Yoshinori was shogun are more specifically identified by more than one era name or nengō.Eikyō  (1429–1441)Kakitsu (1441–1444)

Notes

References
 Ackroyd, Joyce. (1982) Lessons from History: The Tokushi Yoron. Brisbane: University of Queensland Press.  ;  OCLC 7574544
 Blum, Mark Laurence and Shinʼya Yasutomi. (2005).  Rennyo and the Roots of Modern Japanese Buddhism.  New York: Oxford University Press, USA.  (cloth)
 Crompton, Louis, Homosexuality and Civilization, Cambridge, Massachusetts, Harvard University Press, 2003.
 Keene, Donald. (2003).  Yoshimasa and the Silver Pavilion: The Creation of the Soul of Japan. New York: Columbia University Press. ; OCLC 52268947
 Kinihara, Misako. "The Establishment of the Tosenbugyo in the Reign of Ashikaga Yoshinori" (唐船奉行の成立 : 足利義教による飯尾貞連の登用), Tokyo Woman's Christian University: Essays and Studies. Vol. 44, No.  2, pp. 27–53.
 Titsingh, Isaac. (1834). Nihon Ōdai Ichiran''; ou, [https://books.google.com/books?id=18oNAAAAIAAJ&dq=nipon+o+dai+itsi+ran  Annales des empereurs du Japon.  Paris: Royal Asiatic Society, Oriental Translation Fund of Great Britain and Ireland. OCLC 585069

See also

 East Asian age reckoning

1394 births
1441 deaths
14th-century Japanese people
15th-century shōguns
Yoshinori
Ashikaga clan